Abbotsham is a rural locality in the local government area (LGA) of Central Coast in the North-west and west LGA region of Tasmania. The  recorded a population of 89 for Abbotsham.

History 
Abbotsham was gazetted as a locality in 1962. The name was in use by 1877 but not shown on maps until after 1883.

Geography
Almost all of the boundaries are survey lines.

Road infrastructure 
Route B15 (Castra Road) passes through from north to south.

References

Towns in Tasmania
Localities of Central Coast Council (Tasmania)